Arthur Frederick Wright (December 3, 1913 – August 11, 1976) was an American historian and sinologist. He was a professor of history at Yale University.  He specialized in Chinese social and intellectual history of the pre-modern period.

Early life
Wright's undergraduate degrees at Stanford University and Oxford University were followed by further studies at Harvard.  He earned a master's degree in 1940; and he was awarded a doctorate in 1947.

Career
Wright and his wife, Mary C. Wright, joined the faculty of Stanford University in 1947; and both were made full professors in 1958.  In 1959, Wright and his wife joined the faculty at Yale.  In 1961, Wright became the Charles Seymour Professor of History at Yale.

Wright believed that the scholar "should occasionally stand back and contemplate the whole continuum of time and of problems which give meaning to his specialized studies."

Selected works
In a statistical overview derived from writings by and about Arthur Wright, OCLC/WorldCat encompasses roughly 70+ works in 200+ publications in 6 languages and 8,800+ library holdings.

 Studies in Chinese Thought (1953)
 Buddhism in Chinese History (1957)
 
 Confucianism and Chinese civilization (1964)
 Perspectives on the Tʻang (1973)
 The Sui Dynasty (1978) (about the Sui Dynasty)
 The Confucian Persuasion (1980)
 Studies in Chinese Buddhism (1990)

References 

1913 births
1976 deaths
20th-century American historians
Alumni of the University of Oxford
American sinologists
Harvard University alumni
Historians of China
Internees at the Weixian Internment Camp
Presidents of the Association for Asian Studies
Stanford University alumni
Writers from Portland, Oregon
Yale University faculty